Inès Longevial (born 20 November 1990) is a French painter currently working in Paris.

Life and career 
Inès Longevial grew up in the South-West of France. Her mother encouraged her art and she painted her first paintings at the age of 8.

She holds a Baccalauréat from STI Applied Arts and a Diplôme supérieur d'arts appliqués from Toulouse.
She moved to Paris at age 23. In 2016, her paintings were exhibited at Galerie M in Toulouse.

Her first solo exhibit was Sous Le Soleil in Los Angeles at the HVW8 Gallery in 2017. Subsequently, she appeared on the cover of the magazine Juxtapoz.

In 2018, she had another solo exhibit at Galerie M Toulouse Je Pleure Comme Je Ris. The painter performed a residency / exhibition entitled Je Suis Une Couleur in October 2018 in San Francisco for the Chandran Gallery.

That same year, she was chosen to design the new bottle Evian and Badoit in limited edition with the agency BETC.

In 2019, she self-produced her first Parisian exhibition at the Tournelles Gallery.

References 

1990 births
Living people
20th-century French women artists
21st-century French women artists
21st-century French painters
20th-century French painters
French women painters
French illustrators
French women illustrators